Sir Alan Fraser Wilkie (born 26 December 1947), styled The Honourable Mr Justice Wilkie, is a former British judge and barrister. He retired on 31 January 2017.

Early life
Wilkie was born on 26 December 1947. He was educated at Hutchesons' Grammar School, a private school in Glasgow, Scotland, and Manchester Grammar School, an all-boys independent school in Manchester, England. He studied law at Balliol College, Oxford.

Legal career
Wilkie was called to the bar at Inner Temple in 1974. He was made a Queen's Counsel (QC) on 28 April 1992. On 27 January 1995, he was appointed to the South Eastern Circuit as a Recorder, a part-time judge.

Wilkie became a full-time judge in 1997. On 9 April, he was appointed a circuit judge. He has been a judge of the High Court of Justice (Queen's Bench Division) since 1 October 2004. He was a Presiding Judge of the North Eastern Circuit from 2007 to 2010. On 1 April 2012, he was appointed to the Judicial Appointments Commission for a five-year period.

Notable cases that Wilkie presided over include the trial of Lord Ahmed for death by dangerous driving, the Milly Dowler murder trial, the trial of Bishop Peter Ball for sexual abuse, and the trial of Thomas Mair for the murder of Batley and Spen MP Jo Cox. Wilkie sentenced "canoe man" John Darwin and his wife, Anne, in 2008.

He concluded that the London Bridge Terrorist Usman Kahn was so dangerous "that the public could only be protected by the imposition of an indeterminate sentence". This conclusion was overturned by the Court of Appeal under Lord Leveson with the result that Kahn was let out on licence and stabbed two people to death in November 2019.

Personal life
Wilkie married Susan in 1972.

Honours
Wilkie was made a Knight Bachelor upon becoming a High Court Judge in 2004. He is an Honorary Member of The Society of Legal Scholars.

See also
Murder of Jo Cox
Murder of Milly Dowler

References

1947 births
Living people
People educated at Hutchesons' Grammar School
People educated at Manchester Grammar School
Alumni of Balliol College, Oxford
Members of the Inner Temple
Queen's Bench Division judges
Knights Bachelor
English King's Counsel